The 1924 United States presidential election in South Dakota took place on November 4, 1924, as part of the 1924 United States presidential election which was held throughout all contemporary 48 states. Voters chose five representatives, or electors to the Electoral College, who voted for president and vice president. 

South Dakota voted for the Republican nominee, incumbent President Calvin Coolidge of Massachusetts, over Independent nominee, Senator Robert M. La Follette of Wisconsin and Democratic nominee, Ambassador John W. Davis of West Virginia. Coolidge ran with former Budget Director Charles G. Dawes of Illinois, while Davis ran with Governor Charles W. Bryan of Nebraska and La Follette ran with Montana Senator Burton K. Wheeler.

Coolidge won South Dakota by a margin of 12.73% of the vote.

With 36.96 percent of the popular vote, South Dakota would prove to be La Follette's fifth strongest state in the 1924 election in terms of popular vote percentage after Wisconsin, North Dakota, Minnesota and Montana. He carried 18 counties here.

Results

Results by county

See also
 United States presidential elections in South Dakota

Notes

References

South Dakota
1924
1924 South Dakota elections